This list consists of cargo ships which are registered in Greece and subject to the laws of that country. Any ship which flew the flag at any point in its career, and is present in the encyclopedia, is listed here.

List of ships

References 

Greece
Greece
Ships of Greece